The Rider Tavern (also Rider's Hotel or Old North Charlton Inn) is an historic tavern on Stafford Street in the Northside Village Historic District of Charlton, Massachusetts.  The tavern, now a large three story wood-frame building, was built c. 1797, and was for many years an important stop on the stagecoach road.  It is owned by the Charlton Historical Society, and open for guided tours in the summer and special events.

The building was listed on the National Register of Historic Places in 1976, and included in the Northside Village Historic District in 1977.

See also
National Register of Historic Places listings in Worcester County, Massachusetts

References

External links
Charlton Historical Society

Taverns in Massachusetts
Drinking establishments on the National Register of Historic Places in Massachusetts
Museums in Worcester County, Massachusetts
History museums in Massachusetts
Buildings and structures in Charlton, Massachusetts
National Register of Historic Places in Worcester County, Massachusetts
Historic district contributing properties in Massachusetts